Minu väike paradiis is the second album by Estonian rock band Terminaator, released in 1995. It's also the first album by Terminaator to appear on a CD. The sound is a bit heavier than on the previous album. The cover features Terminaator's mascot.

Track listing

Song information 

 "Lõbus maja" is about a bordello, where you can escape from everyday life. A live version is on "Go Live 2005".
 "Viski" is about alcoholism, which is compared to a girl from one night stand.
 The message of "4B" is: "What should I do to make you understand I love you?". It is also featured on "Kuld".
 "Ma lähen alla" is a song about going down and not trying to fight it, also exampling other pointless deeds.
 "Saatus" is about a man, whose life is a trail of mishaps and who realizes many sad things. It's also on "Go Live 2005".
 "Valus vesi" is about self-loathing and being tired of life.
 "Juulikuu lumi" is about the sad side of love. It's the most famous song by Terminaator. It is also on "Kuld" and "Go Live 2005".
 "Isa ütles" is about how Kreem's father disapproved the band. Also on "Go Live 2005"
 "Minu väike paradiis" is about a madman, who thinks he can do anything in "his little paradise".
 "Ütle miks" is a seaman's story. Before leaving to sea, it's hard for him to say goodbye to his beloved and on the trip he misses her badly. Upon coming back, he finds out, that she has forgotten him – it's just what he had feared. Also featured on "Kuld".

Band members
Sven Valdmann - bass
Eimel Kaljulaid - drums
Elmar Liitmaa - guitar, backing vocals
Jaagup Kreem - vocals

External links 
 
 Estmusic.com Listen to the songs.

1995 albums
Terminaator albums
Estonian-language albums